Avon County Council was the county council of the non-metropolitan county of Avon in south west England. It came into its powers on 1 April 1974 and was abolished on 1 April 1996 at the same time as the county. The county council was based at Avon House in Bristol. It was replaced with four authorities: Bristol City Council, South Gloucestershire Council, North Somerset Council and Bath and North East Somerset Council.

Political control
Since the first election to the council in 1973 political control of the council has been held by the following parties:

Council elections
1973 Avon County Council election
1977 Avon County Council election
1981 Avon County Council election (new ward boundaries)
1985 Avon County Council election
1989 Avon County Council election
1993 Avon County Council election

County result maps

References

Former county councils of England
History of Gloucestershire
History of Somerset
1974 establishments in England
1996 disestablishments in England
County Council